California X is the debut full-length album by American band California X. It was released in January 2013 under Don Giovanni Records.

Track listing

Reception

California X was named album of the week for January 15, 2013, by Alarm magazine.

References

2013 albums
California X albums
Don Giovanni Records albums